Stephen Adam (died 1405) of New Romney was an English politician who was MP for an unknown constituency (probably New Romney) in 1376. History of Parliament Online theorizes that he was the father of John Adam.

References

People from New Romney
English MPs 1376
1405 deaths